Grafton is both a surname and a given name. Notable people with the name include:

Surname:
Anthony Grafton (born 1950), American historian
C. W. Grafton (1909–1982), American novelist
Frederick William Grafton (1816–1890), British industrialist and politician
Jimmy Grafton (1916–1986), English writer, producer and theatrical agent 
Joseph Grafton (1757–1836), founder of the Newton Theological Institution
Nathan Grafton (1826–1915), American politician and manufacturer
Peter Grafton (1916–2012), British Liberal Party politician and surveyor 
Richard Grafton (died 1573), English printer and historian
Sue Grafton (1940–2017), American author

Given name:
Grafton Baker (c. 1806–1881), first chief justice of the Supreme Court of the New Mexico Territory
Grafton D. Cushing (1864–1939), American politician
Grafton Green (1872–1947), American jurist
Grafton K. Mintz (1925–1983), American copy editor
Grafton Njootli (1947–1999), Canadian politician
Grafton Elliot Smith (1871–1937), Australian anatomist